The Maple League of Universities, previously known as the U4, is an association of four universities in eastern Canada. The four member institutions, Acadia University, Bishop's University, Mount Allison University, and St. Francis Xavier University, are all primarily undergraduate.

Members

The four member universities of the Maple League are all primarily undergraduate and located in Eastern Canada: one in Quebec, one in New Brunswick, and two in Nova Scotia. All were established in the early 1800s.

History
The Maple League was founded in 2013 as the U4, and adopted its current name in 2016. The name "Maple League" was inspired by the Ivy League in the United States.

See also
U15 Group of Canadian Research Universities

References

External links

 
College and university associations and consortia in Canada